Felix Obada (born 3 November 1989) is a Nigerian football forward who currently plays for Küçük Kaymaklı Türk in the Turkish Cypriot KTFF Süper Lig.

Career
Obada began his career in the youth side with Invincible Leopard. In 2005 he was transferred to Kwara United. After two successful years with Kwara United he was transferred to Thanda Royal Zulu.

In 2008 the Nigerian winger was eyed by Malmö FF. The Swedish top club offered trials for Obada and his companion Bernard Parker. The trial took place for two weeks and both impressed according to Bengt Madsen. This season so far at TRZ has participated in 4 games for the club, scoring 1 "thunderous" goal and signed on 18 July 2009 for Maritzburg United.

References

External links
 

1989 births
Living people
Nigerian footballers
Nigerian expatriate sportspeople in South Africa
Nigerian expatriate footballers
Association football midfielders
Maritzburg United F.C. players
Kwara United F.C. players
Expatriate soccer players in South Africa
Sportspeople from Warri
Thanda Royal Zulu F.C. players
Moroka Swallows F.C. players
Expatriate footballers in Northern Cyprus
Nigerian expatriate sportspeople in Northern Cyprus
Çetinkaya Türk S.K. players
Free State Stars F.C. players